Mike Dietze (born July 19, 1989) is an American soccer player.

Career 
Born in Ridgewood, New Jersey, Dietze grew up in Ramsey, New Jersey and played high school soccer at Don Bosco Preparatory High School.

He played four years of college soccer at Seton Hall University beginning in 2008 and played in the USL Premier Development League for NJ-LUSO Rangers FC. He made 16 appearances for the Rangers in 2012, tallying 4 goals and 2 assists. Dietze participated in the 2013 NASL Combine where he was noticed by the Strikers' coaching staff and was invited to preseason with the team. On March 25, 2013, the Strikers announced that he had signed his first professional contract with the club. In 2014, Dietze signed with the Philadelphia Fury for the inaugural season of the ASL, where he played in all 10 matches, scoring once.

References

External links 
 Fort Lauderdale Strikers Bio
 Ramsey resident signs with Fort Lauderdale Strikers

1989 births
Living people
American soccer players
Seton Hall Pirates men's soccer players
NJ-LUSO Parma players
Fort Lauderdale Strikers players
People from Ramsey, New Jersey
People from Ridgewood, New Jersey
Soccer players from New Jersey
Sportspeople from Bergen County, New Jersey
USL League Two players
North American Soccer League players
Don Bosco Preparatory High School alumni
Association football midfielders
Philadelphia Fury players